"Alice" is a song by the American electronica musician Moby. It was released as the second single from his eighth studio album, Last Night, on 10 March 2008. It features guest vocals from the British MC Aynzli Jones and members of the Nigerian group 419 Squad.

The music video was directed by Andreas Nilsson and is a collage of footage interspersed with Jones' head performing the song, along with clips of explosions and scientific experiments, and scenes of violence and discrimination from classic B-movies; one such scene is from the film Blood Tide which has James Earl Jones punching a watermelon in time to the music.

Track listing 
 CD single 
 "Alice"  – 3:36
 "Alice"  – 5:03
 "Alice"  – 5:10
 "Alice"  – 6:19
 12-inch single 
 "Alice"  – 5:03
 "Alice" – 4:27
 "Alice"  – 6:20
 "Alice"  – 4:01
 Digital single
 "Alice"  – 3:33
 Digital EP
 "Alice"  – 3:36
 "Alice"  – 5:03
 "Alice"  – 5:10
 "Alice"  – 6:20
 "Alice"  – 4:01

Charts

References

External links 
 

2008 singles
Moby songs
Mute Records singles
2008 songs
Songs written by Moby